Ludmila Prokunina-Olsson  is a molecular medical geneticist who conducts genetic and functional analyses downstream of genome-wide association studies (GWAS) for various human traits, including cancer, immune and infectious diseases. She is chief of the Laboratory of Translational Genomics (LTG) at the National Cancer Institute.

Life 
Prokunina-Olsson received an M.Sc. in molecular genetics from Moscow State University. She earned a Ph.D. in medical genetics from Uppsala University Faculty of Medicine in 2004. Her dissertation was titled Strategies for identification of susceptibility genes in complex autoimmune diseases. Marta Alarcon-Riquelme was her doctoral advisor and Juha Kere was an opponent of her dissertation.

During 2005 to 2008, she was a visiting fellow with Francis Collins in the genome technology branch of the National Human Genome Research Institute. Prokunina-Olsson joined the Laboratory of Translational Genomics (LTG) of the division of Cancer Epidemiology and Genetics (DCEG) as a research fellow in June 2008. She became a tenure-track investigator in April 2010 and was awarded National Institutes of Health (NIH) scientific tenure and promoted to senior investigator in December 2014. She became acting chief of LTG in February 2018 and was appointed as chief in December 2018. Prokunina-Olsson explores the connections between the genome-wide association studies (GWAS)-identified genetic susceptibility variants and molecular phenotypes of importance for cancer. Some of her findings have resulted in translational and clinical applications.

References 

Living people
1967 births
Place of birth missing (living people)
Moscow State University alumni
Uppsala University alumni
National Institutes of Health people
Medical geneticists
21st-century Russian women scientists
Russian geneticists
Women geneticists
Russian emigrants to the United States
Expatriate academics in the United States
Molecular geneticists
Russian medical researchers
Women medical researchers
Cancer researchers